Spalding is an unincorporated community in Menominee County, Michigan, United States. Spalding has a post office with ZIP code 49886.

History
A post office called Spalding has been in operation since 1874. The community was named for Jesse Spalding, of Chicago.

Climate
This climatic region is typified by large seasonal temperature differences, with warm to hot (and often humid) summers and cold (sometimes severely cold) winters.  According to the Köppen Climate Classification system, Spalding has a humid continental climate, abbreviated "Dfb" on climate maps.

Photos

References

Unincorporated communities in Menominee County, Michigan
Unincorporated communities in Michigan